Nguyễn Văn Lý (born 30 May 1942) is a Vietnamese long-distance runner. He competed in the marathon at the 1964 Summer Olympics.

References

1942 births
Living people
Athletes (track and field) at the 1964 Summer Olympics
Vietnamese male long-distance runners
Vietnamese male marathon runners
Olympic athletes of Vietnam
Place of birth missing (living people)